Hernán Ramírez Necochea  (1917-1979) was a Chilean Marxist historian. In 1968 he became director of the faculty of Philosophy and Education in the University of Chile. Following the 1973 Chilean coup d'etat he went to exile in Paris, France where he lectured in the Paris-Sorbonne University.

References

1917 births
1979 deaths
Chilean schoolteachers
Chilean exiles
People from Valparaíso
University of Chile alumni
Academic staff of the University of Chile
Paris-Sorbonne University
Chilean Marxist historians
20th-century Chilean historians
20th-century Chilean male writers
Chilean communists
Chilean expatriates in France